Alton is a city in Osborne County, Kansas, United States.  As of the 2020 census, the population of the city was 100.

History
Alton was founded in 1870 as Bull City, and was named in honor of Hiram C. Bull. It was renamed Alton in 1885, after the city of Alton, Illinois because female residents didn't like the former name.

Geography
Alton is located at  (39.468196, −98.947360).

Climate
Alton has a humid continental (Dfa) climate typical for the central Great Plains. Summers are hot and often very humid, with heavy rain from thunderstorms not uncommon, whilst tornadoes are a frequent hazard and are often followed by heavy rainfall. Winter weather varies greatly from warm or even hot weather due to chinook winds to extreme cold when a North American High with very cold air moves southwards from Canada. The coldest temperature recorded in Alton has been  on December 23, 1989.

One of the highest recorded temperatures in American history (and the highest in Kansas' recorded history) was recorded near Alton on July 24, 1936. Only four states — California, Arizona, New Mexico and Nevada — have seen higher record temperatures.

The lowest temperature ever recorded in Kansas was measured in Lebanon, which sits in the adjacent Smith County, only about 35 miles away.

Demographics

2010 census
As of the census of 2010, there were 103 people, 47 households, and 22 families residing in the city. The racial makeup of the city was 97.1% White and 2.9% from two or more races.

There were 47 households, of which 21.3% had children under the age of 18 living with them, 38.3% were married couples living together, 8.5% had a female householder with no husband present, and 53.2% were non-families. 40.4% of all households were made up of individuals, and 21.3% had someone living alone who was 65 years of age or older. The average household size was 2.19 and the average family size was 2.77.

The median age in the city was 48.3 years. 18.4% of residents were under the age of 18; 6% were between the ages of 18 and 24; 22.4% were from 25 to 44; 25.3% were from 45 to 64; and 28.2% were 65 years of age or older. The gender makeup of the city was 52.4% male and 47.6% female.

2000 census
As of the census of 2000, there were 117 people, 58 households, and 33 families residing in the city. The racial makeup of the city was 98.29% White, and 1.71% from two or more races. Hispanic or Latino of any race were 1.71% of the population.

There were 58 households, out of which 25.9% had children under the age of 18 living with them, 48.3% were married couples living together, 5.2% had a female householder with no husband present, and 41.4% were non-families. 37.9% of all households were made up of individuals, and 15.5% had someone living alone who was 65 years of age or older. The average household size was 2.02 and the average family size was 2.65.

In the city, the population was spread out, with 18.8% under the age of 18, 9.4% from 18 to 24, 26.5% from 25 to 44, 21.4% from 45 to 64, and 23.9% who were 65 years of age or older. The median age was 40 years. For every 100 females, there were 95.0 males. For every 100 females age 18 and over, there were 106.5 males.

The median income for a household in the city was $23,750, and the median income for a family was $33,125. Males had a median income of $20,000 versus $21,875 for females. The per capita income for the city was $15,584. There were 7.4% of families and 17.6% of the population living below the poverty line, including 9.1% of under eighteens and 8.0% of those over 64.

Education
Alton is served by USD 392 Osborne County Schools.

Alton High School was closed through school unification in 1970. The Alton High School mascot was Wildcats.

Notable people
 Hiram C. Bull politician and businessman
 Len Dugan American football player
 Bruce Goff architect and a designer of the Boston Avenue Methodist Church
 Russell Stover confectioner and first mass-producer of the Eskimo Pie

References

Further reading

External links
 Alton - Directory of Public Officials
 Historic Images of Alton – Wichita State University Libraries
 USD 392, local school district
 Alton city map, KDOT

Cities in Kansas
Cities in Osborne County, Kansas